North Braddock is a borough in Allegheny County, Pennsylvania, United States. North Braddock was organized from a part of Braddock Township in 1897. The borough prides itself in being the "Birth Place of Steel" as the home of Andrew Carnegie's Edgar Thomson Steel Works that opened in 1875. The borough is located in the valley along the Monongahela River, and is made up of three jurisdictional voting wards.

The 2020 census had the borough population at 4,320, a great decline from the 1930 population of 16,782.  The decline is due largely to the diminishing steel industry in the region.

History

Origins
In 1742 a Scottish trader named John Fraser from eastern Pennsylvania acquired land at the location of the current Edgar Thomson Steel Works from Queen Aliquippa and the Lenape people. Fraser settled his family on the location, and in 1753 Christopher Gist and  George Washington met with Fraser while delivering messages from Governor Robert Dinwiddie of Virginia to French commanders At Fort LeBoeuf, in present-day Waterford, PA. Dinwiddie demanded the French commanders withdraw from western Pennsylvania. Fearing that a conflict was on the horizon, Fraser returned to Philadelphia in 1754.

In 1755 General Edward Braddock and British troops left Virginia and used Fraser as the guide with General Washington as the aide on the expedition. The objective of the expedition was to expel the French at Fort Duquesne. It was on July 9, 1755, when the British troops arrived at Frazier's cabin to be met with gunfire from the French troops. During the battle Braddock was wounded, dying on July 13, 1755, in nearby Uniontown.  The area where Braddock was shot became known as Braddock's Field.  Historical markers identify the site on present-day Jones Avenue across from Benjamin Fairless School. Braddock's Battlefield History Center commemorates this battle.

Whiskey Rebellion
During the late 18th-century farming was prevalent in the North Braddock area with the nearby Monongahela River used for trade. Whiskey became a very profitable product to trade, with much being sent to the New Orleans area. In 1794 a whiskey tax was created, drawing in protest over 8,000 settlers from western Pennsylvania to the North Braddock area, as part of the Whiskey Rebellion. The angry settlers would not disperse easily, and President Washington led an army to suppress the rebellion.

Wallace Mansion
Here Wallace built a mansion as his summer home. Later the Marquis de La Fayette visited the country as the Guest of the Nation, and while doing so he stopped by Judge Wallace's mansion on May 28, 1825. After Wallace's death the home was left to his nephew who lost the property to a sheriff sale. The Wallace mansion would be used as a boarding school called the Edgeworth Ladies Seminary during the 1830s.

Coal and steel
In 1835 the first coal mine opened between the hills near Sixth Street. During the 19th century the railroad industry was expanding across the country. Andrew Carnegie, with the increasing demands in steel for the railroad, began to build his first steel mill in 1872, named for John Edgar Thomson, the president of the Pennsylvania Railroad. By 1873 the demand for steel for the railroad had decreased, and the construction of the mill was halted. Good news came though when Carnegie secured a $2 million loan and finished the steel mill to roll its first steel under the supervision of superintendent William R. Jones. The mill would go on to expand, and in 1880 the first blast furnace was used at the Edgar Thomson Steel Works.

Incorporation
During 1897, East Pittsburgh tried to annex the land around the mill of North Braddock, known as Bessemer, that was part of Braddock Township. Residents of Shady Park village (3rd ward) and of Wolftown (1st ward) came together to hold meetings on stopping East Pittsburgh from annexing the land near the mill known as Braddock's Field. William Yost serving as North Braddock's attorney petitioned the Quarter Sessions of Allegheny County that Shady Park and Wolftown would join as one town, also incorporating Braddock's Field. During the meetings 317 of 510 property owners signed an agreement helping Judge Kennedy make his ruling to form a new town. On Monday, April 26, 1897, North Braddock was incorporated as a borough. Judge Kennedy of the Quarter Sessions Court of Allegheny County made the ruling and ordered the decree for the new borough. The first election of officials was to be held on May 18, 1897. The winners of the election included the burgess Henry Anderson, councilmen Joseph Wallace, John Walberg, John Maxwell, WJ Vance, Thomas Clark, J Grant Anderson, Fred Edwards, tax collector John Hutzen, and school directors Jones, Johnson, Scott, Colmey, Crossey, and Anderson.

North Braddock celebrated its borough centennial with a festival of events in June 1997.

Geography
North Braddock is located at  (40.405025, -79.856500). It occupies a slope of terrain between Braddock, which touches the Monongahela River, and East Pittsburgh, which occupies the highest ground.

Surrounding and adjacent neighborhoods
North Braddock has five land borders, including Braddock Hills to the north, Chalfant to the northeast, Wilkins Township to the east, East Pittsburgh to the east and southeast, and Braddock to the southwest and west.  Across the Monongahela River to the south, North Braddock runs adjacent with Kennywood Park in West Mifflin.

Demographics

As of the census of 2000, there were 6,410 people, 2,631 households, and 1,681 families residing in the borough. The population density was 4,155.5 people per square mile (1,607.1/km2). There were 3,250 housing units at an average density of 2,106.9 per square mile (814.8/km2). The racial makeup of the borough was 61.70% White, 35.30% African American, 0.17% Native American, 0.31% Asian, 0.05% Pacific Islander, 0.59% from other races, and 1.87% from two or more races. Hispanic or Latino of any race were 1.25% of the population.

There were 2,631 households, out of which 28.5% had children under the age of 18 living with them, 35.0% were married couples living together, 23.0% had a female householder with no husband present, and 36.1% were non-families. 31.8% of all households were made up of individuals, and 15.6% had someone living alone who was 65 years of age or older. The average household size was 2.43 and the average family size was 3.06.

In the borough the population was spread out, with 27.0% under the age of 18, 6.7% from 18 to 24, 26.5% from 25 to 44, 21.5% from 45 to 64, and 18.4% who were 65 years of age or older. The median age was 39 years. For every 100 females, there were 89.3 males. For every 100 females age 18 and over, there were 82.6 males.

The median income for a household in the borough was $24,335, and the median income for a family was $30,473. Males had a median income of $30,960 versus $22,281 for females. The per capita income for the borough was $14,076. About 18.0% of families and 22.7% of the population were below the poverty line, including 40.4% of those under age 18 and 9.2% of those age 65 or over.

Government

North Braddock has a borough government. The borough has nine elected council members and a mayor who serve four-year terms. The borough manager conducts daily business and operates with the budget passed by council.  Ordinances and building codes are enforced by the appointed code official.  The borough solicitor provides legal consultation for legal issues.  An engineering firm is contracted to provide consultation for infrastructure issues.  The elected tax collector serves a four-year term. North Braddock is a member of the Turtle Creek Valley Council of Governments.

Public safety
North Braddock VFD - Fire and rescue services are provided by the North Braddock VFD.  The department is staffed by all volunteers. All personnel are certified through the Allegheny County Fire Academy.  Two fire stations are used on Wolfe Avenue and Bell Avenue.  The fire service has four trucks consisting of an Engine, Rescue, Service, & Squad.  The fire service is dispatched by Allegheny County 911. 
North Braddock Police - The police chief leads the daily operations of the police department.  The department protects and serves the borough 24 hours a day. The department utilizes numerous equipped vehicles for patrol. The police are dispatched by Allegheny County 911.
Priority One EMS - Priority One EMS located on Baldridge Avenue provides emergency ambulance services staffed by certified EMT and Paramedic personnel.  Priority One also serves Braddock, East Pittsburgh, and Rankin.

Schools

North Braddock School District
North Braddock once operated its own North Braddock School District to provide public education for the residents. The district had a number of school buildings throughout the borough. The schools used included, Original North Braddock High School (Bell Avenue), North Braddock Scott High School (Bell Avenue), Hartman Junior High School (Wolfe Avenue), Bell Avenue School (Bell Avenue), Brinton Avenue School (Brinton Avenue), McClure School (Electric Avenue), Jones Avenue Junior High School (Jones Avenue), Shady Park School (Lobinger Avenue), and Ben Fairless School (Jones Avenue).

General Braddock Area School District
The North Braddock School District merged into the General Braddock Area District with Braddock & Rankin in the 1970s.

Woodland Hills School District
General Braddock Area School District was merged under court orders into the Woodland Hills School District in 1981 with 12 other nearby communities.  Woodland Hills educates students from 12 communities with elected board members representing the residents.  The Woodland Hills Administration Building is located in the former Fairless Elementary School on Jones Avenue in North Braddock.

Sports championships
 

North Braddock Scott High School won championships in football, basketball, & baseball. General Braddock Area High School won a state basketball championship in 1973.

Football Titles
1933 WPIAL Class A Champions - Gardner Point System Champion
1934 WPIAL Class A Champions - North Braddock Scott 6 - Ambridge 0
1935 WPIAL Class AA Champions - Gardner Point System Champion
1937 WPIAL Class AA Champions - Gardner Point System Champion

Basketball Titles
1931 WPIAL Class AAA Champions - Scott 36 - Duquesne 11
1931 PIAA Class AAA Champions - Scott 28 - Lower Merion 15
1943 WPIAL Class AAA Champions - Scott 34 - Ford City 29
1973 PIAA Class AAA Champions - General Braddock 63 - Reading 62 (General Braddock High School After Merger)

Baseball Titles
1929 WPIAL Champions
1930 WPIAL Champions

Notable people
Steve Breaston - NFL wide receiver, star player for the University of Michigan and Woodland Hills High School.
Wes Lyons - NFL tight end/wide receiver, star player at West Virginia University and Woodland Hills High School.  Also an author of his first book, "The Pursuit With Patience".
Coley McDonough - NFL quarterback for the Pittsburgh Steelers and Chicago Cardinals. Star player for the North Carolina State University and North Braddock Scott High School.  Coley was tragically killed in the line of duty as a Pittsburgh police officer after his football career. 
Elmer Merkovsky - NFL player for the Pittsburgh Steelers, star player at the University of Pittsburgh, and North Braddock Scott High School.
Lousaka Polite - NFL fullback, who was a star player at the University of Pittsburgh, and Woodland Hills High School.
Fran Rogel - NFL fullback for the Pittsburgh Steelers and star player at Penn State University and North Braddock Scott High School.
Benjamin L. Rosenbloom - North Braddock High School and West Virginia University graduate who practiced law and became a US Representative for West Virginia.
Jim Zockoll - Founder and chairman of The Zockoll Group Ltd. in the United Kingdom, raised in the town outside of Pittsburgh with his brother Fred.

References

External links

North Braddock Borough
North Braddock VFD
County Borough Profile
Woodland Hills School District

Boroughs in Allegheny County, Pennsylvania
Pittsburgh metropolitan area
Populated places established in 1897
Pennsylvania populated places on the Monongahela River